Bologna Violenta  is the first self-titled studio album by the Italian one man band Bologna Violenta, released in 2006.

The album is self-produced and was printed in 1200 copies, the distribution was given to SKP Records and Noisecult Records.
The titles of the songs are inspired by the poliziottesco movies of the 1970s.

In the booklet of the album is the text-poem "A different picture of a city seemingly happy and friendly" dedicated, as the rest of the album, to the hidden violent side of the city of Bologna.

Track listing
 Città violenta
 Il cittadino si ribella
 Corruzione al Palazzo di Giustizia
 Paura in città
 Violenza contro la violenza
 Bologna trema, la polizia può sparare
 La violenza, quinto potere
 Bologna odia
 Bologna, l'altra faccia della violenza
 La via della droga
 Bologna rovente
 Bologna drogata, la polizia non può intervenire
 Bologna centrale del vizio
 I violenti di bologna bene
 Bologna difendersi o morire
 Bologna spara!
 Bologna calibro 9
 Bologna nera
 Bologna a mano armata
 Provincia violenta
 La morte risale a ieri sera (i bolognesi ammazzano il sabato)
 I padroni della città
 Puttane a Bologna (Bologna come Budapest)
 La città sconvolta, caccia spietata ai rapitori
 Bologna si ribella
 Bologna, ultimo atto
 Tira la boccia

References

2006 debut albums
Bologna Violenta albums